The 1917 Marquette Hilltoppers football team was an American football team that represented Marquette University as an independent during the 1917 college football season. In its first season under head coach John J. Ryan, the team compiled an 8–0–1 record, shut out eight of nine opponents, and outscored all opponents by a total of 341 to 7.

Schedule

References

Marquette
Marquette Golden Avalanche football seasons
College football undefeated seasons
Marquette Hilltoppers football